Jo Tu Chahay is a 2019 Pakistani television series that premiered on Hum TV. Produced by Momina Duraid under MD Productions, it stars Imran Abbas, Alizeh Shah, Ahmad Taha Ghani, and Zarnish Khan in lead roles. It received mixed reviews from critics as well as viewers for being dragged.

Synopsis 
The general theme and focus of the series is the importance of keeping faith in a higher power, a soulful romance, and being careful about what you wish for.

The plot centres around Mashal, an orphan who lives with her grandmother, also known as Apa Ji. Mashal's parents died in a car accident when she was 5 years old. She is mistreated by her aunts, Tayi Ammi, Fasiha and Shama Cachi, and her cousins, Bisma and Areesha but her uncles and 2 of her cousins Hashir and Arman are always kind with her. Her cousin Burhan is always harassing her.

Controversy 
The serial was earlier titled Kun Faya Kun. However, due to controversies and objections from a religious group (Kun Faya Kun is not only the attribute of Allah Almighty but also a Quranic verse), the program's producers rebranded it to Jo Tu Chahey.

Reception 
During the run of the series, it obtained mixed reviews from both critics and the audience. However, by the season finale, it went on to be one of the top 10 trending dramas in Pakistan with a huge TRP of 10.3. It has an extensive base in the YouTube community with over 3 million views per episode. It was doing average till it was re-branded. After re-branding, it faced a drastic boost in its viewership.

It also did well in UK where it several times tops the weekly chart of Pakistani and Asian TV shows.

Cast
 Imran Abbas as Hashir Abbas
 Alizeh Shah as Mashal Azam
 Zarnish Khan as Bisma Ubaid
 Azra Mansoor as Aapa Ji
 Areej Mohyudin as Areesha Abbas
 Ahmad Taha Ghani as Armaan Ubaid
 Raeed Muhammad Alam as Burhan Ubaid
 Naima Khan as Fasiha Begum
 Nargis Rasheed as Shama Begum
 Mohsin Gilani as Mohammad Ubayd
 Humayun Gul as Mohammad Abbas

References

External links 
 Official website

2019 Pakistani television series debuts
Pakistani drama television series
Urdu-language television shows
Hum TV original programming